Grotto Mountain is a mountain located in the Bow River valley, across from Canmore, Alberta, Canada. It is a popular hiking spot among locals and is home to the Rat's Nest Cave.

The mountain was named for a grotto-like cave within it.

The pictographs where the creek first narrows into canyon area warning of FALLING ROCK ! Made ~3000 years ago perhaps by the Hopi tribe, stand under there long enough you will be hit by rock slides as the paintings exhibit broken things and animals ...

There are two main scrambling routes:
 Northwest Variation - from the ACC clubhouse, ascends the northwest side of the mountain on a good hiking trail. At tree line, the trail narrows to the false summit. From there, it is a gradual ascent to the summit with brief stints of scrambling but mostly hiking.
 Direct route. Ascends directly under the summit. Shorter but more arduous.

References

Two-thousanders of Alberta
Alberta's Rockies